Salman Nazar (born 29 March 1991) is a Canadian cricketer who plays as all-rounder for the Canada national cricket team. Salman is an left-handed batsman and a slow left-arm orthodox bowler. He is regarded as one of the best fielders of Canada. Salman's consistency as a bowling all-rounder is admired in Canada's domestic circuit for over a decade. He is first Canadian cricketer to take 400 wickets in Canadian domestic tournaments.

Career
Salman Nazar made his first-class debut against the Netherlands on 22 August 2013. On his debut, he made 60 runs off 76 balls.

In 2012, Nazar made his debut in Twenty20 for Canada in Caribbean Twenty20 what's now known as Caribbean Premier League. After the tour, Nazar decided to spend a summer in England, and signed a contract with Spring View Cricket Club in the Bolton Cricket Association. He finished the 2012 season with 100 wickets, which included 10 five-wicket hauls at bowling average of 11.05 and a best of 9/64.

On 3 June 2018, he was selected to play for the Vancouver Knights in the players' draft for the inaugural edition of the Global T20 Canada tournament. In October 2018, he was named in Canada's squad for the 2018–19 Regional Super50 tournament in the West Indies. He made his List A debut for Canada in the 2018–19 Regional Super50 tournament on 3 October 2018.

In June 2019, he was selected to play for the Toronto Nationals franchise team in the 2019 Global T20 Canada tournament.

In October 2021, he was named in Canada's Twenty20 International (T20I) squad for the 2021 ICC Men's T20 World Cup Americas Qualifier tournament in Antigua. He made his T20I debut on 10 November 2021, for Canada against the United States. In February 2022, he was named in Canada's squad for the 2022 ICC Men's T20 World Cup Global Qualifier A tournament in Oman.

References

External links

1991 births
Living people
Canadian cricketers
Canada Twenty20 International cricketers
Canadian sportspeople of Pakistani descent